The 2002–03 NBA season was the 35th season for the Phoenix Suns in the National Basketball Association. After missing the playoffs the previous season, the Suns had the ninth pick in the 2002 NBA draft, and selected high school basketball star Amar'e Stoudemire, and signed free agent Scott Williams during the off-season. Frank Johnson returned as head coach, as the Suns held a 29–21 record at the All-Star break, and posted eight additional wins from the previous season to finish fourth in the Pacific Division with a 44–38 record. The Suns returned to the playoffs after snapping a streak of 13 seasons in a row the year before, a franchise record. America West Arena hosted Suns home games.

Point guard Stephon Marbury and forward Shawn Marion provided a pair of 20–20 scorers, with Marbury averaging 22.3 points, 8.1 assists and 1.3 steals per game, while Marion averaged 21.2 points, 9.5 rebounds and 2.3 steals per game. The 20-year-old 6' 10" Stoudemire was drafted to balance out a team that had been deep at the guard position in years past, averaging 13.5 points and 8.8 rebounds per game, while Anfernee Hardaway provided the team with 10.6 points and 4.4 assists per game, and second-year guard Joe Johnson contributed 9.8 points per game. Marbury and Marion were both selected for the All-Star Game, while Marbury ended the season as a member of the All-NBA Third Team.

The Suns earned the eighth and final Western Conference playoff spot, and were matched against the top-seeded San Antonio Spurs in the Western Conference First Round. The Suns won Game 1 on the road, 96–95, but lost the series to the eventual league champions, four games to two. The Spurs would reach the Finals to defeat the New Jersey Nets in six games, winning their second championship.

In Stoudemire, who earned NBA All-Rookie First Team honors, and became the first high school draft pick to become NBA Rookie of the Year, the Suns had drafted an athletic big man to join the equally athletic Marion for the coming seasons. Following the season, Bo Outlaw was traded to the Memphis Grizzlies.

Offseason

NBA Draft

Roster

Regular season

Standings

Record vs. opponents

Playoffs

Game log

|- align="center" bgcolor="#ccffcc"
| 1
| April 19
| @ San Antonio
| W 96–95 (OT)
| Stephon Marbury (26)
| Shawn Marion (12)
| Stephon Marbury (6)
| SBC Center19,217
| 1–0
|- align="center" bgcolor="#ffcccc"
| 2
| April 21
| @ San Antonio
| L 76–84
| Stephon Marbury (32)
| Shawn Marion (12)
| Stephon Marbury (5)
| SBC Center19,217
| 1–1
|- align="center" bgcolor="#ffcccc"
| 3
| April 25
| San Antonio
| L 86–99
| Stephon Marbury (25)
| Joe Johnson (9)
| Stephon Marbury (7)
| America West Arena19,023
| 1–2
|- align="center" bgcolor="#ccffcc"
| 4
| April 27
| San Antonio
| W 86–84
| Stephon Marbury (18)
| Shawn Marion (14)
| Hardaway, Marbury (7)
| America West Arena18,756
| 2–2
|- align="center" bgcolor="#ffcccc"
| 5
| April 29
| @ San Antonio
| L 82–94
| Shawn Marion (22)
| Amar'e Stoudemire (14)
| Stephon Marbury (7)
| SBC Center19,217
| 2–3
|- align="center" bgcolor="#ffcccc"
| 6
| May 1
| San Antonio
| L 85–87
| Shawn Marion (24)
| Shawn Marion (15)
| Penny Hardaway (5)
| America West Arena18,913
| 2–4
|-
|}
|-
! colspan=2 style="color:#FF8800" | 2003 playoff schedule
|}

Awards and honors

Week/Month
 Amar'e Stoudemire was named Western Conference Rookie of the Month for January.
 Amar'e Stoudemire was named Western Conference Rookie of the Month for April.
 Frank Johnson was named Western Conference Coach of the Month for December.
 Stephon Marbury was named Western Conference Player of the Week for games played November 24 through November 30.
 Stephon Marbury was named Western Conference Player of the Week for games played January 5 through January 11.
 Shawn Marion was named Western Conference Player of the Week for games played April 7 through April 13.

All-Star
 Shawn Marion was selected as a reserve for the Western Conference in the All-Star Game. It was his first All-Star selection.
 Stephon Marbury was selected as a reserve for the Western Conference in the All-Star Game. It was his second All-Star selection.
 Amar'e Stoudemire was selected to play for the Rookie team in the Rookie Challenge.
 Stephon Marbury was selected to compete in the Skills Challenge. Marbury lost the competition to the player he was traded to Phoenix for, Jason Kidd.
 Amar'e Stoudemire was selected to compete in the Slam Dunk Contest. Stoudemire finished third, behind Desmond Mason and champion Jason Richardson.

Season
 Amar'e Stoudemire received the Rookie of the Year Award.
 Stephon Marbury was named to the All-NBA Third Team.
 Amar'e Stoudemire was named to the NBA All-Rookie First Team.
 Shawn Marion finished 13th in Defensive Player of the Year voting.
 Joe Johnson finished 11th in Sixth Man of the Year voting.
 Stephon Marbury finished 14th in Most Improved Player voting.
 Penny Hardaway finished 26th in Most Improved Player voting.

Player statistics

Season

† – Minimum 300 field goals made.
^ – Minimum 125 free throws made.

Playoffs

† – Minimum 20 field goals made.
^ – Minimum 5 three-pointers made.
# – Minimum 10 free throws made.

References

External links
 Standings on Basketball Reference

Phoenix Suns seasons